Nawalparasi (Bardaghat Susta East) 1 is one of two parliamentary constituencies of Nawalpur District in Nepal. This constituency came into existence on the Constituency Delimitation Commission (CDC) report submitted on 31 August 2017.

Incorporated areas 
Nawalparasi (Bardaghat Susta East) 2 incorporates Bungdikali Rural Municipality, Hupsekot Rural Municipality, Madhyabindu Municipality, Binayi Tribeni Rural Municipality and wards 3, 14, 15, 16 and 17 of Kawasoti Municipality.

Assembly segments 
It encompasses the following Gandaki Provincial Assembly segment

 Nawalparasi (Bardaghat Susta East) 2(A)
 Nawalparasi (Bardaghat Susta East) 2(B)

Members of Parliament

Parliament/Constituent Assembly

Provincial Assembly

2(A)

2(B)

Election results

Election in the 2020s

2022 general election

2022 provincial election

2(A)

2(B)

Election in the 2010s

2017 legislative elections

2017 Nepalese provincial elections

2(A)

2(B)

See also 

 List of parliamentary constituencies of Nepal

References

External links 

 Constituency map of Nawalparasi (Bardaghat Susta East)

Parliamentary constituencies of Nepal
2017 establishments in Nepal
Nawalpur District
Constituencies established in 2017